Ashin Yazeinda, better known by his pen name Yawai Nwe, is a prominent Burmese Theravada Buddhist monk and writer.

Ashin Yazeinda was born on 18 June 1969 in the town of Inma, Thegon Township, Pegu Division to parents U Thein Ni Sein and Daw Kyin Nu. He ordained as a novice (Pali: samanera) in 1979, and again in 1980. He began penning stories for the Flower magazine in 1985. 

In 1989, he was fully ordained as a bhikkhu, and studied at Rangoon's Mahavisuddhāruṃ Pali University and Monastery. The following year, he began publishing Dhamma articles in the Myat Mingala journal. 

In 2000, the Burmese government conferred him the title of Sāsanadhaja Dhammācariya. In January 2003, he published a seminal religious work, Would You Like to Meet Every Existence?.

He currently resides at the Dhammayawei Monastery in Thingangyungyi ward, Mingaladon Township, Yangon.

References

External links
Official website
Official blog

1969 births
Theravada Buddhist monks
Burmese Theravada Buddhists
Burmese Buddhist monks
Living people
People from Bago Region